Love Zone is the first solo debut album by R&B/soul singer and backing vocalist Ullanda McCullough, released on Ocean/Ariola Records in 1979. It features the soul cover version of "Want Ads", originally done by the sweet and soulful female group of the '70s with 3 ladies, named, Edna Wright, Shellie Clark and Carolyn Willis, called, Honey Cone and "Stars", written by George McMahon and Leon Pendarvis, plus the whole album, was produced by Bernard Drayton, George McMahon and Leon Pendarvis.

Track listing

"Stars" (George McMahon, Leon Pendarvis) 10:22 	
"Gotta Dance Now" (George McMahon, Leon Pendarvis, Ullanda McCullough)  4:36 	
"Time For You and Me" (George McMahon, Leon Pendarvis) 5:11 	
"Want Ads" (Barney Perkins, General Norman Johnson, Greg Perry) 5:13 	
"Love Zone" (Nickolas Ashford & Valerie Simpson) 5:37 	
"Around and Around" (Frank Floyd, Ullanda McCullough) 5:14

Charts

Singles

Personnel
Stars

Arranged By – Leon Pendarvis 
Backing Vocals – Frank Floyd, Gwen Guthrie, Leon Pendarvis, Ullanda McCullough, Vivian Cherry 
Bass – Francisco Centeno 
Drums – Chris Parker 
Engineer [Assistant] – Tom Greto Guitar – Cliff Morris, Steve Khan 
Keyboards – Leon Pendarvis 
Mixed By [Disco Mix] – John Luongo 
Percussion – Arthur Jenkins, Jimmy Maelen 
Recorded By, Mixed By – Ed Rak 
Saxophone, Soloist – George Young
Synthesizer – Rob Mounsey

Gotta Dance Now

Arranged By – Leon Pendarvis 
Backing Vocals – Ullanda McCullough, Vivian Cherry, Yvonne Lewis 
Bass – Wilbur Bascomb 
Congas – Arthur Jenkins 
Drums – Chris Parker
Guitar – Hiram Bullock, Joe Caro 
Keyboards – Leon Pendarvis 
Percussion – Errol "Crusher" Bennett, Rubens Bassini
Synthesizer – Rob Mounsey 
	
Time For You And Me

Arranged By – Leon Pendarvis 
Bass – Anthony Jackson 
Congas – Arthur Jenkins 
Drums – Chris Parker
Guitar – Jeff Mironov, Joe Caro 
Keyboards – Leon Pendarvis 
Percussion – Errol "Crusher" Bennett, Rubens Bassini

Want Ads

Arranged By – Leon Pendarvis 
Backing Vocals – Gwen Guthrie, Ullanda McCullough, Vivian Cherry 
Bass – Francisco Centeno 
Drums – Chris Parker
Electric Piano [Fender Rhodes] – Ray Chew 
Guitar – Jeff Mironov, Joe Caro 
Percussion – Errol "Crusher" Bennett, Arthur Jenkins, Rubens Bassini 
Piano – Leon Pendarvis 
Saxophone, Soloist – Harold Vick 
Synthesizer – Rob Mounsey 
	
Love Zone

Arranged By – Ray Chew 
Backing Vocals – Ullanda McCullough, Vivian Cherry, Yvonne Lewis 
Bass – Francisco Centeno 
Drums – Chris Parker
Electric Piano [Fender Rhdoes] – Leon Pendarvis 
Guitar – Jeff Mironov, Joe Caro 
Percussion – Errol "Crusher" Bennett, Arthur Jenkins, Rubens Bassini 
Piano, Synthesizer – Ray Chew

Around And Around

Arranged By – Ray Chew 
Bass – Will Lee 
Drums – Chris Parker 
Electric Piano [Fender Rhodes] – Leon Pendarvis 
Guitar – Hiram Bullock, Joe Caro 
Percussion – Arthur Jenkins 
Piano – Ray Chew 
Synthesizer – Ray Chew

Companies etc

Phonographic Copyright (p) – Ariola America, Inc.
Recorded At – Power Station
Recorded At – A&R Studios
Recorded At – Automated Sound Studios
Mastered At – Kendun Recorders
Copyright (c) – Ocean Records 
Phonographic Copyright (p) – Ocean Records

Credits

Art Direction – Michael Duncan Jackson
Contractor – Sephra Herman
Coordinator [Album Coordinator] – Mary Roach, Sally Paulson, Sue Evans 
Engineer [Assistant] – Ollie Cotton, Jr., Peter Robbins, Steve Ettinger, Tom Greto
Horns – Alan Rubin, David Taylor, George Young, Harold Vick, Howard Johnson, Virgil Jones
Mastered By – John Golden
Other [Clothes Designed By] – Kamali
Other [Copying By] – Sammy's
Other [Make-up By] – Rick Gillette
Other [Ullanda's Hair By] – James Finney
Photography By – Klaus Lucka
Producer – Bernard Drayton, George McMahon, Leon Pendarvis
Recorded By [Additional Recording By, A&r Studios] – Ed Rak, LeAnne Ungar
Recorded By [Additional Recording By, Automated Studios] – Vicki Fabry
Recorded By, Mixed By – Bill Scheniman (tracks: A2 to B3)
Strings – Gerald Tarack, Kathryn Kienke, LaMar Alsop, Lewis Eley, Regis Iandiorio, Stanley Pollock, Tony Posk, Yoko Matsuo

Notes

Center Label: (p)1979 Ariola America, Inc. Beverly Hills, CA. 90211
Inner sleeve: (c)(p)1979 Ocean Records, Beverly Hills, Ca. 90212

References

External links

1979 debut albums
Ariola Records albums
Ullanda McCullough albums